Hesar Now (also Romanized as Ḩeşār Now) is a village in Firuzeh Rural District, in the Central District of Firuzeh County, Razavi Khorasan Province, Iran. At the 2006 census, its population was 483, in 109 families.

References 

Populated places in Firuzeh County